Abu al-Hasan Ali Ibn Ibrāhim al-Qummi was a 10th century Shi'a commentator and jurist of Persian origin. He lived during the time of the eleventh Shi'a Imam Hasan al-Askari. Many traditions in the famous book Al-Kafi were transmitted by him. Ibrāhim’s patronymic was “Abu al-Hasan” but he was also known as “al-Shaykh al-Aqdam”. He was the first to promulgate the “Kufan” traditions (Hadiths) in Qom and collected Hadith from many scholars. He wrote more than 15 books, famously his commentary Tafsir al-Qummi. He is said to have been one of the most important Twelver Imami Quran commentators. His other works include Akhbār Al-Qurʾan, Nawadir al-Qurʾan, al-Nasikh wa al-Mansukh (Abrogator and Abrogated books), al-Sharā'i'  (Laws or Revealed religions), and al-Tawhid wa al-Shirk (Monotheism and Polytheism). He died in 919 A.D.

Birth, Demise and Family 
His birthday is unknown; but it is certain that he lived during the second half of the 3rd/ninth and beginning of fourth/tenth centuries.

His father, Ibrahim b. Hashim, was one of the famous Shi'a hadith transmitters, who moved from Kufa to Qom. It is said that he was the first person who disseminated the hadiths of the Kufans in Qom. He also met with Imam al-Rida.

'Ali b. Ibrahim's brother, Ishaq, and sons -Ahmed, Ibrahim and Muhammad, were all religious scholars of their time.

Works 
Ali b. Ibrahim wrote many books. Al-Tafsir, commonly known as al-Tafsir al-Qummi, is his most famous book. He compiled it based on traditions of imams without any explanation. He narrated most of the hadiths from his father, Ibrahim b. Hashim. This book is one of the earliest and most important available Shi'a exegesis sources.

 Al-Nasikh wa al-mansukh
 Qurb al-isnad
 Al-Shara'i'''     
 Al-Hayd Al-Tawhid wa l-shirk Fada'il Amir al-Mu'minin 
 Al-Maghazi Al-Anbiya'     
 Al-Mashdhar Al-Manaqib Ikhtiyar al-Qur'an''

References

 Tahoor Encyclopedia: Ali Ibn Ibrähim Qomi commentary
 

10th-century Persian-language writers
10th-century Muslim scholars of Islam
Iranian Shia scholars of Islam